Under the Boardwalk is an upcoming American computer-animated musical comedy film directed by David Soren and written by Lorene Scafaria. The film stars Michael Cera, Keke Palmer, and Bobby Cannavale, and will be produced by Paramount Animation, with DNEG Animation handling animation. It was originally set to be released by Paramount Pictures on July 22, 2022, but has since been delayed indefinitely.

Premise

Voice cast

 Michael Cera 
 Keke Palmer 
 Bobby Cannavale

Production
On June 12, 2019, Paramount Animation announced a new slate of animated features, including a musical film titled Jersey Crabs. By July 2020, the film was retitled as Under the Boardwalk. In August 2020, New Republic Pictures signed a deal with Paramount Pictures to co-finance Paramount's films; Under the Boardwalk was revealed to be one of them.

The film's animation was handled by British visual effects studio DNEG, with its animation division DNEG Animation co-producing the film. Production reportedly began in September 2020 and took place during the COVID-19 pandemic for two years, with completion initially expected in March of 2022. By August 7, 2022, Soren announced that production was completed, while Braam Jordaan, who worked as an animation consultant, announced the film to be in post-production by December 8, 2022.

Music
On July 27, 2021, it was announced that songwriter Sean Douglas would be writing songs for the film. On May 23, 2022, Soren announced that the scoring of Under the Boardwalk was underway. Jonathan Sadoff will also write songs for the film and John Debney will compose the original score for the film.<ref>{{cite web |title=John Debney - Kraft-Engel Management |url=https://kraft-engel.com/clients/john-debney/ |access-date=5 December 2022 |quote=Upcoming for Debney is the Paramount animated feature film Under The Boardwalk, and the highly-anticipated sequel film Hocus Pocus 2''', for Disney+.}}</ref>

Release
The film was originally scheduled to be released on July 22, 2022, but in January 2022, it was taken off the release schedule, with Paws of Fury: The Legend of Hank'' taking over the date. In December 2022, Soren said on Twitter that Paramount was still deciding the release strategy for the film.

References

External links
 Under the Boardwalk at DNEG
 

2020s American animated films
2020s musical films
American children's animated comedy films
American children's animated films
American computer-animated films
American musical comedy films
2020s musical comedy films
Films directed by David Soren (animator)
Films scored by John Debney
Films impacted by the COVID-19 pandemic
Films postponed due to the COVID-19 pandemic
Paramount Animation films
Paramount Pictures animated films
Paramount Pictures films
American 3D films
3D animated films
Films set in New Jersey
Films set on beaches
2020s American films
Upcoming films